Luxembourg is a European Parliament constituency for elections in the European Union covering the member state of Luxembourg. It is currently represented by six Members of the European Parliament. Luxembourg uses the D'Hondt method.

Returned Members of the European Parliament
Note on European parties: the Christian Social People's Party (CSV) is a member of the centre-right European People's Party, the Luxembourg Socialist Workers' Party is a member of the centre-left Party of European Socialists (sitting with S&D) and the Democratic Party (DP) is a member of the centrist European Liberal Democrat and Reform Party (sitting with ALDE).

Elections

1979

The 1979 European election was the first election to the European Parliament and the first for Luxembourg.

1984

The 1984 European election was the second election to the European Parliament and the second for Luxembourg.

1989

The 1989 European election was the third election to the European Parliament and the third for Luxembourg.

1994

The 1994 European election was the fourth election to the European Parliament and the fourth for Luxembourg.

1999

The 1999 European election was the fifth election to the European Parliament and the fifth for Luxembourg. The elections were held on 13 June 1999. Astrid Lulling and Jacques Santer (former Commission President) were elected for the Christian Social People's Party (European People's Party), Colette Flesch for the Democratic Party (European Liberal Democrat and Reform Party) and Robert Goebbels and Jacques Poos for the Luxembourg Socialist Workers' Party (Party of European Socialists).

2004

The 2004 European election was the sixth election to the European Parliament and the sixth for Luxembourg. The elections were held on 13 June 2004. The ruling Christian Social People's Party polled strongly, while the opposition Luxembourg Socialist Workers' Party lost ground.

2009

The 2009 European election was the seventh election to the European Parliament and the seventh for Luxembourg. The elections were held on 7 June 2009.

2014

The 2014 European election was the eighth election to the European Parliament and the eighth for Luxembourg. The elections were held on 25 May 2014.

2019

The 2019 European election was the ninth election to the European Parliament and the ninth for Luxembourg.

References

External links
 European Election News by European Election Law Association (Eurela)
 List of MEPs europarl.europa.eu

1979 establishments in Luxembourg
Constituencies established in 1979
European Parliament
European Parliament constituencies
European Parliament elections in Luxembourg